Tisheh Kan (also Romanized as Tīsheh Kan) is a village in Qarah Su Rural District, in the Central District of Kermanshah County, Kermanshah Province, Iran. At the 2006 census, its population was 246, in 56 families.

References 

Populated places in Kermanshah County